The Atlas of Lie Groups and Representations is a mathematical project to solve the problem of the unitary dual for real  reductive Lie groups.

, the following mathematicians are listed as members:
Jeffrey Adams
Dan Barbasch
Birne Binegar
Bill Casselman
Dan Ciubotaru
Fokko du Cloux
Scott Crofts
Steve Jackson
Alfred Noël
Tatiana Howard
Alessandra Pantano
Annegret Paul
Patrick Polo
Siddhartha Sahi
Susana Salamanca
John Stembridge
Peter Trapa
Marc van Leeuwen
David Vogan
Wai-Ling Yee
Jiu-Kang Yu
Gregg Zuckerman

External links
 Atlas web page

Representation theory of groups